Aga Khan Park & Museum is a surface light rail transit (LRT) stop under construction on Line 5 Eglinton, a new line that is part of the Toronto subway system. Destinations nearby include its namesakes, Aga Khan Park and Aga Khan Museum. The station is scheduled to open in 2023.

The stop is located in the middle of Eglinton Avenue East, on the west side of the intersection with the southbound ramp from and to the Don Valley Parkway southbound. The stop has parallel side platforms. Access to the platforms will be via the pedestrian crossing on the west side of the signalized intersection where the ramp crosses Eglinton Avenue. Just to the west of the stop, there is a double crossover on the ramp descending to Science Centre station.

During the planning stages for Line 5 Eglinton, the stop was given the working name "Ferrand" after the nearby Ferrand Drive. With public consultation, Metrolinx proposed changing the name to "Aga Khan & Eglinton" finally choosing "Aga Khan Park & Museum". Metrolinx said that "The Aga Khan Museum is a highly visible landmark. Naming this surface-level LRT stop [after the museum] provides a unique and self-locating identifier."

Surface connections 

, the following are the proposed connecting routes that would serve this station when Line 5 Eglinton opens:

References

External links

Line 5 Eglinton stations